Nellu may refer to
 Nellu (1974 film), a landmark Malayalam film starring Prem Nazir
 Nellu (2010 film), a Tamil drama film